The Greengage Summer (called The Loss of Innocence in the U.S.) is a 1961 British drama film directed by Lewis Gilbert and starring Kenneth More and Susannah York (in her first leading role). It was based on the novel The Greengage Summer (1958) by Rumer Godden. Set in Épernay, in the Champagne region of France, it is the story of the transition of a teenage girl into womanhood.

More later named it as his favourite film, stating, "[Susannah York] was just twenty-one and an adorable creature...it was one of the happiest films on which I have ever worked."

Plot 
Joss Grey (Susannah York), a 16-year-old English girl, finds herself responsible for the care of her three younger siblings on a summer holiday in France when their mother is suddenly taken ill and rushed to the hospital. When they go to the Hotel Oeillets, proprietress Mademoiselle Zisi (Danielle Darrieux) does not want the responsibility of unchaperoned children, but her enigmatic English lover Eliot (Kenneth More) persuades her to accept them. As the days pass, she wishes she had stuck to her original answer; she is increasingly jealous of the attention Eliot pays to the children—especially to Joss.

Meanwhile, hotel employee Paul (David Saire) becomes suspicious of Eliot, snoops in his room, and finds a pistol. Eliot catches Paul and gets Zisi to fire him, but Joss's 13-year-old sister Hester (Jane Asher) has taken a liking to Paul and begs Joss to get Eliot to reconsider, which he does. But later he becomes angry when shutterbug Hester takes his picture. Then he rushes out of a tour of caves where champagne is stored to avoid famous guest Monsieur Renard (Raymond Gérôme), the best policeman in France. He also insists on turning away potential guests.

Tensions come to a boiling point when Zisi throws a glass of champagne in her rival's face. Eliot chases after her, saying—within Joss's hearing—that she is only a child. Learning from a newspaper article that Eliot is a notorious jewel thief, the outraged Joss mails Hester's photo of him to the police.

Eliot has already decided to leave. He sneaks out late at night, but, on hearing a drunken Paul attack Joss in her bedroom on the second floor, he rushes up to her room. He punches Paul, who then tries to climb down a drainpipe. The pipe breaks and he falls to his death. He tells everyone not to call the police. A remorseful Joss confesses to Eliot that she has denounced him to the police. At her request, he gives her a grownup kiss. Then he disposes of Paul's body and disappears.

While Renard is questioning the unco-operative children the next morning, their solicitor uncle, Mr Bullock (Maurice Denham), arrives. He has been summoned by an unsigned telegram to extricate them. From the source of the message, Renard realizes that it is from Eliot and that he is trying to escape across the border to Germany on a river barge. Renard explains that Eliot is now also suspected of murdering Paul, but Joss states he died in an accident after trying to escape from her room. With it now almost certain that the police will capture Eliot attempting to escape via the river barge, Hester breaks down in tears and is consoled by her uncle, while Joss walks away alone from the hotel down a country lane, disconsolate but accepting the consequences of her actions.

Cast

Production 
The film was a co-production between Victor Saville and Edward Small for United Artists. It was meant to be one of several the two made together, a never-filmed adaptation of The Mousetrap intended to be another, with the third being Legacy of a Spy. Cary Grant was the original choice for the male lead. However, the film was eventually set up at Columbia.

More later wrote that Lewis Gilbert insisted he go on a diet before making the film in order that he might be more believable as a romantic lead. More did so as he very badly wanted to make the movie.

Hayley Mills was originally offered a lead role.

Filming started 29 August 1960 at Shepperton Studios.

Reception 
The film premiered on 5 April 1961 at the Odeon Leicester Square in London's West End. Reviews were positive. Varietycalled it a "leisurely, romantic drama."

Lewis Gilbert thought Kenneth More was miscast. "He was somehow too normal, it didn't quite work; that's a role Dirk [Bogarde] should have played because you could well imagine a girl of fifteen or sixteen falling in love with Dirk."

Susannah York also felt that, though she "loved" the movie "I didn't think that was a totally successful film. I always felt that Dirk Bogarde was the person for the Kenneth More role. It needed someone with a touch of dark mystery and Dirk would have been perfect." (York and Bogarde did eventually appear together some years later in the spy comedy-drama Sebastian, released in 1968).

References 
Citations

Works cited

External links 
 
 

1961 films
1960s coming-of-age drama films
1961 romantic drama films
British coming-of-age drama films
British romantic drama films
Columbia Pictures films
1960s English-language films
Films about vacationing
Films based on British novels
Films based on works by Rumer Godden
Films directed by Lewis Gilbert
Films produced by Edward Small
Films produced by Victor Saville
Films scored by Richard Addinsell
Films set in France
1960s British films